The Prix du Livre Inter is a prize for best French novel of the year. It is awarded by the radio channel France Inter. It was established in 1975 at the initiative of Paul-Louis Mignon.

List of recipients

References

Awards established in 1975
French literary awards
Radio France
1975 establishments in France